Lyctos Facula is a bright mountain on one of Jupiter's smallest moons Amalthea.  It is believed to have a width of 25 kilometers . It is one of two named faculae that appear on Amalthea, the other being Ida Facula. It was discovered by Voyager 1 in 1979 and in the same year named for the region of Crete in which Zeus was raised. Firstly it was named simply Lyctos.

References 

Amalthea (moon)
Extraterrestrial mountains
Surface features of Jupiter's moons